The Burundi Ligue A, also called Primus Ligue for sponsorship reasons, is the highest division in football in Burundi. The league was formed in 1972 and has 16 teams. They play 30 rounds home and away during a season.

Current clubs
The following sixteen clubs are competing in the Primus Ligue during the 2022–23 season.

Previous champions

 1963: Stella Matutina FC (Bujumbura)
 1964: Stella Matutina FC (Bujumbura)
 1965: Maniema Fantastique (Bujumbura)
 1966: Maniema Fantastique (Bujumbura)
 1967: Maniema Fantastique (Bujumbura)
 1968: Maniema Fantastique (Bujumbura)
 1969: Espoir FC (Bujumbura)
 1970: Inter FC (Bujumbura) **
 1971: TP Bata (Bujumbura) ***
 1972: Sports Dynamic (Bujumbura) **
 1973: not held, due to civil war late in the year 1972 when massacres occurred to disrupt the start of the league that was meant to end in 1973
 1974: Inter FC (Bujumbura) **
 1975: Inter FC (Bujumbura)
 1976: Prince Louis FC (Bujumbura) **
 1977: Inter FC (Bujumbura)  */**
 1978: Inter FC (Bujumbura) **
 1979: Vital'O FC (Bujumbura)
 1980: Vital'O FC (Bujumbura)
 1981: Vital'O FC (Bujumbura)
 1982: Maniema Fantastique (Bujumbura) **
 1983: Vital'O FC (Bujumbura)
 1984: Vital'O FC (Bujumbura)
 1985: Inter FC (Bujumbura)
 1986: Vital'O FC (Bujumbura)
 1987: Inter FC (Bujumbura) **
 1988: Inter FC (Bujumbura) *
 1989: Inter FC (Bujumbura) **
 1990: Vital'O FC (Bujumbura)
 1991: AS Inter Star (Bujumbura) **
 1992: AS Inter Star (Bujumbura)
 1993: not held or abandoned
 1994: Vital'O FC (Bujumbura)
 1995: Maniema Fantastique (Bujumbura)
 1996: Vital'O FC (Bujumbura)
 1997: Maniema FC (Maniema)
 1998: Vital'O FC (Bujumbura)
 1999: Vital'O FC (Bujumbura)
 2000: Vital'O FC (Bujumbura)
 2001: Prince Louis FC (Bujumbura)	
 2002: Muzinga FC (Bujumbura)
 2003: not finished
 2004: Athlético Olympic FC (Bujumbura)
 2005: AS Inter Star (Bujumbura)
 2006: Vital'O FC (Bujumbura)
 2007: Vital'O FC (Bujumbura)
 2008: AS Inter Star (Bujumbura)
 2009: Vital'O FC (Bujumbura)
 2010: Vital'O FC (Bujumbura)
 2010–11: Athlético Olympic FC (Bujumbura)
 2011–12: Vital'O FC (Bujumbura)
 2012–13: Flambeau de l'Est (Ruyigi)
 2013–14: LLB Académic FC (Bujumbura)
 2014–15: Vital'O FC (Bujumbura)
 2015–16: Vital'O FC (Bujumbura)
 2016–17: LLB Sport 4 Africa (Bujumbura)
 2017–18: Le Messager FC de Ngozi
 2018–19: Aigle Noir FC
 2019–20: Le Messager FC de Ngozi
 2020–21: Le Messager FC de Ngozi
 2021–22: Flambeau du Centre

* Vital'ô were disqualified due to "affaire Tchambala".
** Vital'ô finished second.
*** Vital'ô were founded as Rwanda Sport FC in 1957, changed name to ALTECO from 1962 to 1965, to Tout Puissant Bata from 1966 to 1970, then merged with Rapide in 1971 to become Espoir from 1971 to 1972, and were renamed Vital'ô in 1972.

Performance by club

Top scorers

See also
Burundian Cup

References

External links
 Football for the Peoples. Burundi
 League at fifa.com
 RSSSF competition history
 Burundi Premier League on Soccerway

 
1
Burundi
1972 establishments in Burundi
Sports leagues established in 1972